Auberive is a commune in the Haute-Marne department in the Grand Est region in northeastern France.

Geography
The Aujon flows west through the northeastern part of the commune. The Aube forms part of the commune's southern border, then flows northwest through the western part of the commune, where it crosses the village.

Population

Images

See also
Communes of the Haute-Marne department

References

Communes of Haute-Marne